Provençal may refer to:

Of Provence, a region of France
Provençal dialect, a dialect of the Occitan language, spoken in the southeast of France
Provençal, meaning the whole Occitan language
Franco-Provençal language, a distinct Romance language, which should not be confused with the Occitan language or with the Provençal dialect of the Occitan language
Provencal cuisine
Provencal wine
Provencal, Louisiana, a village in the United States
Provencal, an alternative name for the Italian wine grape Dolcetto

See also 
 Jeu provençal, a French boules game

Language and nationality disambiguation pages